The 2023 Tournoi de France will be the 3rd edition of the Tournoi de France, an international women's football tournament, consisting of a series of friendly games, that will be held in France from 15 to 21 February 2023. The four national teams involved in the tournament registered a squad of 23 players.

The age listed for each player is on 15 February 2023, the first day of the tournament. The numbers of caps and goals listed for each player do not include any matches played after the start of tournament. The club listed is the club for which the player last played a competitive match prior to the tournament. The nationality for each club reflects the national association (not the league) to which the club is affiliated. A flag is included for coaches that are of a different nationality than their own national team.

Squads

Denmark
Coach: Lars Søndergaard

The final squad was announced on 3 February 2023.

France
Coach: Corinne Diacre

The final squad was announced on 8 February 2023.

Norway
Coach: Hege Riise

The final squad was announced on 6 February 2023.

Uruguay
Coach: Ariel Longo

A preliminary squad was announced on 28 January 2023. The final squad was announced on 9 February 2023.

Player representation

By club
Clubs with 3 or more players represented are listed.

By club nationality

By club federation

By representatives of domestic league

References

Tournoi de France (Women)